Kortelainen is a Finnish surname, most prevalent in Finland and Sweden. Notable people with the surname include:

 Anna Kortelainen (born 1968), Finnish scholar
 Jorma Kortelainen (1932-2012), Finnish cross-country skier
 Jouni Kortelainen (born 1957), Finnish long-distance runner

References

Finnish-language surnames